Samaila is a village located in the city of Kraljevo. According to the 2011 census, the village has a population of 1,466 inhabitants.

Gallery

Notable people
 Goca Božinovska, Serbian folk singer

References

External links
 NEMA BRIGE ZA NATALITET: U sokaku graja 40 mališana at novosti.rs 

Populated places in Raška District